Mark III served as Greek Patriarch of Alexandria between 1180 and 1209.

Relations with the Church of Rome
At the time, many Latin merchants had settled in Egypt, along with priest chaplains, and Latin prisoners held by the Muslims.  In 1190, Mark wrote to the Byzantine Canonist from Antioch Theodore Balsamon for his opinion on whether or not it was permitted to continue the practice of admitting the Latins to Holy Communion. Although the Canonist gave an uncompromisingly negative answer, Mark rejected it.  Mark continued to remember the Pope of Rome in the diptychs and administer Holy Communion to Latins.

References

Coptic Orthodox saints
12th-century Patriarchs of Alexandria
13th-century Patriarchs of Alexandria
13th-century Christian saints